The Science Based Targets initiative (SBTi) is a collaboration between the CDP (was Carbon Disclosure Project), the United Nations Global Compact, World Resources Institute (WRI) and the World Wide Fund for Nature (WWF). Since 2015 more than 1,000 companies have joined the initiative to set a science-based climate target.

Organization 
The Science Based Targets initiative was established in 2015  to help companies to set emission reduction targets in line with climate science and Paris Agreement goals. It is funded by IKEA Foundation, Amazon, Bezos Earth Fund, We Mean Business coalition, Rockefeller Brothers Fund and UPS Foundation. In October 2021 SBTi developed and launched the world's first net zero standard, providing the framework and tools for companies to set science-based net zero targets and limit global temperature rise above pre-industrial levels to 1.5 °C. Best practice as identified by SBTi is for companies to adopt transition plans covering scope 1, 2 and 3 emissions, set out short-term milestones, ensure effective board-level governance and link executive compensation to the company's adopted milestones.

Sector-specific guidance
SBTi developed separate sector-specific methodologies, frameworks and requirements for different industries. As of December 2021, guidance is available for: 
 Aviation
 Apparel and footwear
 Financial institutions
 Information and Communication Technology

See also 
 World Resources Institute
 Carbon Disclosure Project
 United Nations Global Compact
 Paris Agreement
 Carbon neutrality

References 

Corporate social responsibility
Environmental science
Greenhouse gases
Greenhouse gas emissions
Organizations established in 2015